Wedgwood railway station served the Wedgwood complex in Barlaston, Staffordshire, England. Although the station is not officially closed, there has been no train service at the station since 2004 and it is instead served by a rail replacement bus.

History 

The station was opened by the London Midland & Scottish Railway on 1 January 1940 to serve the Wedgwood complex in Staffordshire, England. Nearby is Barlaston Hall, and the station also serves the village of Trentham, near Stoke-on-Trent.

It was originally named Wedgwood Halt, and was renamed Wedgwood on 14 June 1965. From 23 May 2004 the line through the station was temporarily closed for major refurbishment work, but upon completion the station was not re-opened; the tracks through the station are still regularly used but trains do not stop there. Along with nearby , a rail replacement bus serves the station instead, operated by D&G 100, which accepts valid rail tickets.

There were plans to have it re-opened to traffic in 2018 when the next West Midlands rail franchise started. This did not happen in 2018, although the new franchise tender includes proposals to reinstate either this station or Barlaston as a stop on a new Birmingham - Stoke - Crewe service.

Access to the platforms is no longer possible as the station has been fenced off. Network Rail have erected signs saying the platforms are structurally unsafe.

Plans to officially close the station to passengers, and reopen , were planned for May 2021. However no Notice of Closure for Wedgwood has been published and there is no service at Barlaston.

See also
Railway stations not officially closed with no services in the United Kingdom

References

Further reading

External links 

 

 

Railway stations in Staffordshire
Former London, Midland and Scottish Railway stations
Wedgwood pottery
Railway stations in Great Britain opened in 1940
Barlaston